Law enforcement in Germany is conducted by federal, state and municipal law enforcement agencies.

Federal law enforcement agencies

Federal Parliament (Bundestag) 
Polizei beim Deutschen Bundestag (Polizei DBT): Federal Parliament Police, responsible for the protection of the premises of the Bundestag in Berlin. In order to uphold the independence of the legislative power from the executive, this police force is responsible, not to the Minister of the Interior, but to the President of the Bundestag.

Federal Ministry of Defence 
Feldjägertruppe: Military Police of the Federal Defense Force

Federal Ministry of Finance 
Bundeszollverwaltung: Federal Customs Service
Zollkriminalamt (ZKA): Customs Investigation Bureau
ZUZ (Zentrale Unterstützungsgruppe Zoll): Customs police tactical unit

Federal Ministry of the Interior 
Bundeskriminalamt (BKA): Federal Criminal Office (comparable role to the Federal Bureau of Investigation)
Missions Abroad and Special Operations unit (BKA ASE): Close protection detail in hazardous areas
Bundespolizei (BPOL): Federal Police
Bereitschaftspolizei (BePo): Riot Police Branch of Federal Police
BFE (Beweissicherungs- und Festnahmeeinheit): Federal Evidence Securing and Arrests Unit
BFE+ (Beweissicherungs- und Festnahmeeinheit plus): Federal Evidence Securing and Arrests Unit with elevated powers
Federal Police Directorate 11 (Bundespolizeidirektion 11): Joint command of BPOL units with special tasks
Bundespolizei-Fliegerstaffel: Federal Police Air Group
German Federal Coast Guard (Deutsches Küstenwache des Bundes): Federal Coast Guard
GSG 9 (GSG 9 der Bundespolizei): police tactical unit of Federal Police
MFE (Mobile Fahndungseinheit): Special Unit for Covered (Individual and Technical) Surveillance
Polizeiliche Schutzaufgaben Ausland (PSA BPOL): Protection force for the security of German diplomatic missions

State law enforcement agencies

Structure 
Landespolizei: State Police
Autobahnpolizei: Highway Patrol of State Police
Bayerische Grenzpolizei (GrePo): border police, exclusively of the state of Bavaria
Bereitschaftspolizei (BePo): Riot Police Branch of State Police
BFE (Beweissicherungs- und Festnahmeeinheit): State Police Special Detention Unit
Kriminalpolizei (KriPo): Detective Branch of State Police
MEK (Mobiles Einsatzkommando): Special Unit for Surveillance and Detention
Schutzpolizei (SchuPo): Uniformed Branch of State Police
SEK (Spezialeinsatzkommando): police tactical unit of State Police
Wachpolizei (WaPol): Branch of State Police for the security of state government buildings or diplomatic facilities, only in the states of Berlin and Hesse
Wasserschutzpolizei (WSP): River Branch of State Police
Landeskriminalamt (LKA): ("State Criminal Office") State Bureau of Investigation, in some states subordinate to the state's police force
MEK (Mobiles Einsatzkommando): most LKAs employ an MEK of their own, operating independently of the regular police MEK
Justiz: Corrections Service

Auxiliary state police forces 
Freiwilliger Polizeidienst (Voluntary Police Service): auxiliary police force in the states of Baden-Württemberg and Hesse
Sicherheitspartner (Security Partner): auxiliary police force in the state of Brandenburg
Sicherheitswacht (Security Watch): auxiliary police force in the states of Bavaria and Saxony

List of the state police forces 
Baden-Württemberg Police
Bavarian State Police 
Berlin Police
Brandenburg Police
Bremen Police
Hamburg Police
Hesse State Police

North Rhine-Westphalia Police
Rhineland-Palatinate Police
Saarland Police

Schleswig-Holstein Police

Municipal law enforcement agencies

Municipal order enforcement agencies 
Kommunaler Ordnungsdienst (KOD): Municipal law enforcement, different regulations by state and local laws
Ordnungsamt (OA): "municipal order agency", most common denomination
Städtischer Ordnungsdienst: "Municipal Enforcement Service"

Municipal police forces 
Polizeibehörde: local "Police Authority" in several states
Gemeindevollzugsdienst (GVD): "Municipal Code Enforcement Service" in the state of Baden-Württemberg
Kommunalpolizei or Stadtpolizei: "Community Police" or "City Police" in cities of the state of Hesse

See also 
Auxiliary Police
Freiwillige Polizei-Reserve, defunct auxiliary police service
Freiwilliger Helfer der Grenztruppen: defunct auxiliary service in East Germany
Freiwilliger Helfer der Volkspolizei: defunct auxiliary police force in East Germany
Grenztruppen: defunct East German Border Troops
Law enforcement in Germany
List of law enforcement agencies
Municipal police
Volkspolizei - defunct East German Police

References 

Law enforcement in Germany
Germany